ReBar Houston, formerly Rich's Houston or simply Rich's, is a gay nightclub in Neartown, Houston, Texas, in the United States.

It was established in 1980s, closed in 2013, then re-opened in 2016.

It was formerly in Midtown, in a  facility that formerly housed the Richland Fan Company. A limited partnership purchased the building in 2015.

In 2019 the club announced it was going to Montrose, where it was previously. It renamed itself to its current name and re-opened that October.

References

External links

 

1980s establishments in Texas
2013 disestablishments in Texas
2016 establishments in Texas
Gay culture in Texas
LGBT culture in Houston
LGBT nightclubs in Texas
Midtown, Houston